Raikal It is located in the Jagtial district, Telangana, India

It is known for being the home place of the ancient temple of Keshavanathaswamy, which was built in 1304 A.D. by Kakatiya King Prataparudra and is called as Kota Gudi, due to the mud fort that surrounds the temple. The temple is a trikutalayam which houses three sanctums for Shiva and Vishnu, and resembles the typical Chalukyan and Kakatiya architectural styles.

National Highway 61 connecting Bhiwandi in Maharashtra and Jagityal in Telanagana, passes through Raikal.

There are 20 villages under Raikal Mandal Kendram
Allipur is the main village and gram panchayat in the Mandal

References  

Villages in Jagtial district